Houssem-Eddine Chaâbane Aouar (born 30 June 1998) is a professional footballer who plays as a midfielder for Ligue 1 club Lyon. Born in France, he made one appearance for the France national team before switching his allegiance to Algeria.

Early life
Houssem-Eddine Chaâbane Aouar was born on 30 June 1998 in Lyon, Auvergne-Rhône-Alpes.

Club career
Aouar joined the Olympique Lyonnais Academy in 2009 at the age of 11.

He signed a three-year professional contract at Lyon in July 2016. He made his first team debut in on 16 February 2017 in a 1–4 away win over AZ Alkmaar in the first-leg match of the round of 32 of the knockout phase of the UEFA Europa League, replacing Sergi Darder after 84 minutes. Aouar scored his first goal for Lyon's first team a week later in the second-leg match against AZ Alkmaar
at Parc Olympique Lyonnais, which Lyon won 7–1. He made his Ligue 1 debut by starting in the away match against Bastia on 16 April 2017, but the match was abandoned at half-time with the score at 0–0. A win was given to Lyon three weeks later. He was nominated for the Golden Boy award in July 2018.

At the beginning of the 2017–18 season, despite having played only five competitive matches for Lyon's first team since he joined the club, Aouar was given the symbolic number 8 (having previously been worn by club legend Juninho) left free when Corentin Tolisso left the club for Bayern Munich in June 2017.

On 11 December 2019, Aouar scored a goal against RB Leipzig in a Champions League group stage match helping Lyon to secure their way into the Champions League round of 16. His side later upset both Juventus and Manchester City to reach the semi-finals, where they were beaten by Bayern Munich.

International career

France
In 2014, Aouar was called up to the France under-17 national team, but only played one game. In 2019, he was a starter throughout the UEFA European Under-21 Championship for the France under-21 national team, eventually being eliminated by Spain in the semi-finals.

In November 2019, Aouar was called up to the France national team, but was unable to join the team due to suffering an injury. He was not replaced in the squad. On 26 August 2020, Aouar received his first call-up for France to prepare for 2020–21 UEFA Nations League matches against Sweden and Croatia in early September. However, on 27 August, he tested positive for COVID-19 during a regular test carried out by Lyon, amid its pandemic in France; he was put into isolation for a fortnight and had to skip training for at least 10 to 15 days. Therefore, France decided to replace him with Nabil Fekir. Aouar eventually made his France debut on 7 October 2020 in a 7–1 friendly win over Ukraine.

Algeria
In March 2023, Aouar switched his international allegiance from his birth country of France to the country of his parents, Algeria. In an interview with the Algerian Football Federation, he said, "the president held out his hand to me and it seemed like it was just meant to be. I had a second chance and I jumped on it." He also added that "regretted" having played for France, saying that he felt he "hadn't made the best choice".

Style of play
Aouar is a versatile attacking midfielder who can play anywhere in midfield, and has been praised for his excellent technical ability and calmness with the ball at his feet.

Personal life
Aouar is of Algerian descent. He holds Juninho and Zinedine Zidane as role models.

Career statistics

Club

International

Honours
Lyon
Coupe de la Ligue runner-up: 2019–20

Individual
UEFA Champions League Squad of the Season: 2019–20

References

External links

Profile at the Olympique Lyonnais website

1998 births
Living people
Footballers from Lyon
French footballers
Association football midfielders
Olympique Lyonnais players
Ligue 1 players
France youth international footballers
France under-21 international footballers
France international footballers
French sportspeople of Algerian descent